John Allen Denny (born November 8, 1952) is an American former professional baseball right-handed pitcher, who played in Major League Baseball (MLB) for the St. Louis Cardinals, Cleveland Indians, Philadelphia Phillies, and Cincinnati Reds, from  to .

Career
Denny was born in Prescott, Arizona, and attended Prescott High School. He excelled at sports there, playing football and basketball as well as baseball. In the 1970 amateur draft, he was selected by the Cardinals in the 29th round. He made his professional debut that year at the age of 17. Denny pitched for the Triple-A Tulsa Oilers in 1974 and went 9–8 with a 3.75 earned run average. He made his major league debut in September.

The next season, Denny started back in Tulsa but he pitched well and soon entered the St. Louis starting rotation. In 1976, Denny had a breakout season. He led the National League in ERA at 2.52 and was the best pitcher on the club. Due to poor run support, his record was just 11–9.

Denny also pitched well in 1978, going 14–11 with a 2.96 ERA, but he fell off badly in 1979 and was traded with Jerry Mumphrey from the Cardinals to the Indians for Bobby Bonds on December 7, 1979. He continued his inconsistent pitching with the Indians, going 24-23 for them in three seasons. He pitched three straight shutouts late in 1981 and was rewarded with a three-year, $2 million contract after the season. Nine months later, he was traded to the Phillies.

In 1983, Denny enjoyed the best season of his career, going 19–6 with a 2.37 ERA. He topped the NL in wins and winning percentage and was second in ERA. He also led the Phillies to the NL championship. In that year's Cy Young Award voting, he received 20 of 24 first-place votes to win going away.

Denny suffered arm problems late in his career. After 1983, he spent two more years in Philadelphia before being traded to Cincinnati. He went 11–10 in 1986 and then retired from baseball.

Denny was rehabilitation coach for the Arizona Diamondbacks organization from 2001 to 2004.

References

External links

1952 births
Living people
Major League Baseball pitchers
Cy Young Award winners
National League ERA champions
National League wins champions
St. Louis Cardinals players
Cleveland Indians players
Philadelphia Phillies players
Cincinnati Reds players
Gulf Coast Cardinals players
St. Petersburg Cardinals players
Arkansas Travelers players
Tulsa Oilers (baseball) players
Baseball players from Arizona
People from Prescott, Arizona